Lauda Musicam of Atlanta is one of the largest amateur musical ensembles performing early music in the United States.  The ensemble's performances consist of mostly Renaissance music, but Baroque music and Medieval music are often included.

"Lauda" in the group's name is Latin for "praise" and "Musicam" is Latin for "music."

Lauda Musicam has roots as an early music ensemble-in-residence at St. Bartholomew's Episcopal Church (Atlanta, GA).  After becoming defunct for a number of years, the group was reorganized in 2009 by mostly members of the former Emory Early Music Ensemble.  Performing for church services throughout the year, the ensemble also performs two or more concerts yearly.

The group is led by Jody Miller, a noted performer of early music and columnist for American Recorder, the journal of the American Recorder Society.  Jody Miller also teaches recorders and other instruments at numerous workshops throughout the United States.

Lauda Musicam is a community-based organization, and is one of the largest early music performing groups in the United States.  Instruments commonly used in the ensemble are replicas of instruments in use during the renaissance period (ca. 1400–1600): recorder, viol, sackbut, cornetto, crumhorn, cornamuse, lute, keyless flute, harpsichord, small harp, percussion.

References 

 Early Music America

External links 
 Music of the Italian Renaissance | Early Music America
 http://www.laudamusicam.org/
 http://www.atlema.org/index.php?option=com_content&view=article&id=60:lauda-musicam&catid=34:sponsored&Itemid=58

Early music groups